The 2008 Arizona State Sun Devils softball team represented Arizona State University in the 2008 NCAA Division I softball season.  The Sun Devils were coached by Clint Myers, who led his third season.  The Sun Devils finished with a record of 66–5.  They played their home games at Alberta B. Farrington Softball Stadium and competed in the Pacific-10 Conference, where they finished first with a 18–3 record.

The Sun Devils were invited to the 2008 NCAA Division I softball tournament, where they swept the Regional and Super Regional and then completed a run through the Women's College World Series to claim their first NCAA Women's College World Series Championship.

Roster

Schedule

References

Arizona State
Arizona State Sun Devils softball seasons
Arizona State Softball
Women's College World Series seasons
NCAA Division I softball tournament seasons
Pac-12 Conference softball champion seasons